The 1961–62 Scottish Cup was the 77th staging of Scotland's most prestigious football knockout competition. The Cup was won by Rangers who defeated St Mirren in the final.

First round

Replays

Second round

Replays

Third round

Replays

Quarter-finals

Replays

Semi-finals

Final

Teams

See also
1961–62 in Scottish football
1961–62 Scottish League Cup

External links
 Video highlights from official Pathé News archive

Scottish Cup seasons
1961–62 in Scottish football
Scot